Clifford C. Michael (born October 5, 1933) was a Canadian politician. He served in the Legislative Assembly of British Columbia from 1983 to 1991, as a Social Credit member for the constituency of Shuswap–Revelstoke.

References

1933 births
Living people
British Columbia Social Credit Party MLAs
Members of the Executive Council of British Columbia
Tourism ministers of British Columbia
20th-century Canadian politicians